Septoria pisi is a fungal plant pathogen infecting peas.

References

External links
 Index Fungorum
 USDA ARS Fungal Database

pisi
Fungal plant pathogens and diseases
Pulse crop diseases
Fungi described in 1857